was a Japanese mandan comedian who played the ukulele.

Biography
Maki was born in Meguro, Tokyo on 26 September 1934. His appearance in the live vaudevillian show Shiroto Yose featuring amateur entertainers established his career as an independent comedian. Shuichi Makino coached him, and gave him his stage name.

Career
In 1960, Maki became the host of the radio program  on Nippon Cultural Broadcasting. In 1963, he hosted the vaudevillian TV show  on TV Asahi.

Maki was elected the leader of the Tokyo Vaudevillian Guild in 1999.

Death
Maki was found dead in the Tama River, separating Ōta, Tokyo and Kawasaki, Kanagawa, in the early hours of 29 April 2013, after apparently having jumped from the Maruko Bridge.

See also
 Kinya Aikawa
 Kyosen Ōhashi

References

External links
  
 Maki Production website 
 

1934 births
People from Meguro
2013 deaths
Japanese comedians
Comedians from Tokyo
Male actors from Tokyo
Ukulele players
Suicides by jumping in Japan
20th-century Japanese male actors
21st-century Japanese male actors
2013 suicides